Salima Rockwell (born January 24, 1972) is a retired American female volleyball player. She was part of the United States women's national volleyball team at the 1998 FIVB Volleyball Women's World Championship in Japan.

College

Rockwell played college volleyball for Penn State from 1991 to 1994 under Russ Rose.

Coaching

After her playing career, Rockwell moved into coaching at Pittsburgh before moving to various other universities.

Rockwell first became an assistant coach for Penn State Nittany Lions women's volleyball team in 2006, a position she held for 2 seasons before joining Texas from 2009 to 2013 as an assistant coach. She then returned to Penn State as the Associate Head Coach 2015 season through the 2017 season. She retired from collegiate coaching in 2018.

She came out of retirement in January 2022 and was named the seventh head volleyball coach at Notre Dame.

Broadcasting career

Rockwell began broadcasting in 2018 and announces at college and international games. She has broadcast games on ESPN, the Longhorn Network, Fox Sports, and the Big Ten Network.

See also
List of Pennsylvania State University Olympians

References

1972 births
Living people
American women's volleyball players
Place of birth missing (living people)
Penn State Nittany Lions women's volleyball players
Setters (volleyball)
American volleyball coaches
African-American volleyball players
Penn State Nittany Lions women's volleyball coaches
Texas Longhorns women's volleyball coaches
21st-century African-American sportspeople
21st-century African-American women
20th-century African-American sportspeople
20th-century African-American women
Notre Dame Fighting Irish women's volleyball coaches
American sports announcers